Nasosnaya Air Base is a military airbase in the municipality of Hacı Zeynalabdin, near the city of Sumqayit in Azerbaijan.

In July 1940, the 50th Fighter Aviation Regiment became part of the 27th Fighter Aviation Division of the Transcaucasus (ZKVO) Air Force at the Nasosnaya airfield. Two squadrons re-equipped from I-15bis to I-153.

The 82nd Fighter Aviation Regiment PVO of the Soviet Air Defence Forces was stationed at the base for decades, possibly since 1945. Since 1977 it flew Mikoyan-Gurevich MiG-25 long-range interceptors. The regiment may have been disbanded in 1993, but MiG-25s continued to be operated by the Azerbaijani Air and Air Defence Force for several years afterwards.

See also
List of airports in Azerbaijan

References

Airports in Azerbaijan
Azerbaijani Air Force bases
Sumgait
Soviet Air Force bases